Johann Sebastian Bach composed the church cantata  (Prepare the paths, prepare the road), 132, in Weimar in 1715 for the fourth Sunday of Advent and led the first performance on 22 December 1715.

The libretto by the court poet Salomo Franck is related to the day's prescribed gospel reading, the testimony of John the Baptist. Franck derives from it thoughts about baptism as a preparation of the individual Christian who is addressed as a limb of Christ.

Bach structured the music in six movements of alternating arias and recitatives, and scored it for a small ensemble of four vocal parts, oboe, strings and continuo. The voices are combined only in the closing chorale, the fifth stanza of Elisabeth Cruciger's hymn "". The music of the chorale, which was possibly on a different sheet, is lost but can be replaced by a setting of the same stanza in a different cantata. In his composition, Bach follows Franck's Baroque imagery closely, illustrating for example the baptismal water.

History and words 

On 2 March 1714 Bach was appointed concertmaster of the Weimar court capelle of the co-reigning dukes Wilhelm Ernst and Ernst August of Saxe-Weimar. As concertmaster, he assumed the principal responsibility for composing new works, specifically cantatas for the Schlosskirche (palace church), on a monthly schedule. He wrote this cantata for the Fourth Sunday in Advent, dating it himself.

The prescribed readings for the Sunday were from the Epistle to the Philippians, "Rejoice in the Lord alway", and from the Gospel of John, the testimony of John the Baptist. The cantata text was written by the court poet Salomon Franck, published in the collection  in 1715. He included the fifth stanza of Elisabeth Cruciger hymn "" (1524). Franck paraphrases in the first aria the passage from the Book of Isaiah which is quoted in the prescribed gospel, "" (Prepare the path for the Lord). The same passage from Isaiah appears in the beginning of Handel's Messiah. Franck also refers to the baptism as a way of preparation. The individual Christian is addressed as a limb of Christ.

Bach led the first performance of the cantata on 22 December 1715 in the ducal chapel. He could not revive the work in Leipzig because tempus clausum was observed there during Advent. The cantata was first published in 1881 in the Bach Gesellschaft edition, edited by Wilhelm Rust.

Structure and scoring 
Bach structured the cantata in six movements, alternating arias and recitatives, concluded by a chorale. As in several other cantatas on words by Franck, it is scored for a small ensemble of four vocal soloists (soprano (S), alto (A), tenor (T) and bass (B)), and a Baroque instrumental ensemble of oboe (Ob), two violins (Vl), viola (Va), cello (Vc) and basso continuo (Bc) including bassoon. A choir is only needed for the chorale, if at all. The title of the autograph score reads: "Dominicâ 4 Adventus Xsti
Concerto. / Bereitet die Wege, bereitet die Bahn. / â 9. / 1 Hautbois. / 2 Violini / 1 Viola / Violoncello. / S:A:T:B: / col Basso per l'Organo / di / GSBach". The duration is given as 22 minutes. The music of the chorale is lost; it may have been noted in a simple setting on a separate sheet, as in the similar case of Nur jedem das Seine, BWV 163, composed four weeks earlier. For practical purposes the same verse, closing Ihr, die ihr euch von Christo nennet, BWV 164, in 1725, may be used.

In the following table of the movements, the scoring follows the Neue Bach-Ausgabe, and the abbreviations for voices and instruments the list of Bach cantatas. The keys and time signatures are taken from the Bach scholar Alfred Dürr, using the symbol for common time (4/4). The instruments are shown separately for winds and strings, while the continuo, playing throughout, is not shown.

Music

1 

The first aria, "!" (Prepare the paths, prepare the road!), is in da capo form in a 6/8 time signature, accompanied by the full ensemble. The soprano renders her calls to prepare the ways in melismas of several measures of semiquavers. John Eliot Gardiner, who conducted the Bach Cantata Pilgrimage in 2000, describes the character of the movement of "insouciant grace and fleet-footed buoyancy befitting a slowish gigue  or a French loure." The oboe adds virtuoso figuration and trills, reminiscent of Bach's secular music. The aria is concluded by rejoicing calls: "" (The Messiah arrives).

2 
The tenor recitative, "" (If you wish to be called God's child and Christ's brother), contains extended arioso passages, to stress "" (the Christians' crown and glory)  and "" (back the heavy stones of sin).

3 
In the bass aria, "" (Who are you? The cello often plays a "concertante role". Its first motif expresses the question and is repeated throughout the movement, and the vocal line is derived from it.

4 
The expressive declamation of the alto recitative, "" (I would freely confess to You, my God), is highlighted by chords in the strings.

5 
A solo violin accents the alto aria, "" (Christ's members, ah, consider), possibly inspired by the words "" (Christ gave as new garments crimson robes, white silk). Gardiner interprets it as "the cleansing effect of baptismal water". The musicologist Julian Mincham supports that, stating: "Bach seldom neglects opportunities of creating musical images of cleansing water when mention is made of the act of baptism. This is the starting point of his invention of the violin obbligato melody".

6 

Recordings 
The listing is taken from the selection on the Bach Cantatas Website. Choirs with one voice per part (OVPP) and instrumental groups playing period instruments in historically informed performances are marked by green background.

References

Sources 
 
 Bereitet die Wege, bereitet die Bahn BWV 132; BC A 6 / Sacred cantata (4th Sunday of Advent) Bach Digital
 BWV 132 Bereitet die Wege, bereitet die Bahn: English translation, University of Vermont

External links 
 Bereitet die Wege, bereitet die Bahn, BWV 132: performance by the Netherlands Bach Society (video and background information)

Church cantatas by Johann Sebastian Bach
1715 compositions
Advent music